Joseph P. Zabilski (July 4, 1917 – April 27, 2002) was an American football and basketball and college athletics administrator.  He served as the head football coach at Northeastern University from 1948 to 1971, compiling a record of 101–77–6. Zabilski was also the head basketball coach at Northeastern from 1948 to 1958, tallying a mark of 82–109.

Zabilski played college football at Boston College from 1938 to 1940.  During World War II, he served as an officer in the United States Navy.  While in the service, he played on the North Carolina Pre-Flight Cloudbusters football team in 1942 coached by Jim Crowley.  In 1946, Zabilski was named line coach at the University of Maine under head coach George E. Allen.  At Maine, he also coached the freshmen basketball and track and field teams.

Head coaching record

Football

References

External links

1917 births
2002 deaths
American football guards
Boston College Eagles football players
Maine Black Bears football coaches
Maine Black Bears men's basketball coaches
North Carolina Pre-Flight Cloudbusters football players
Northeastern Huskies athletic directors
Northeastern Huskies football coaches
Northeastern Huskies men's basketball coaches
College men's basketball head coaches in the United States
College track and field coaches in the United States
United States Navy personnel of World War II
Basketball coaches from Rhode Island
United States Navy officers
Sportspeople from Providence, Rhode Island
Players of American football from Providence, Rhode Island